Brandon Kyle Boggs (born January 9, 1983) is an American former Major League Baseball (MLB) left fielder who played for the Texas Rangers and Milwaukee Brewers from 2008 to 2011. Currently, he is the head coach of the Alpharetta Aviators in the Sunbelt Baseball League.

College
Boggs attended Georgia Tech, where he majored in Science, Technology, and Culture. In 2002 and 2003, he played collegiate summer baseball with the Orleans Cardinals of the Cape Cod Baseball League.

Professional career

Texas Rangers
Boggs was selected in the 4th round of the 2004 Major League Baseball Draft by the Texas Rangers.

Milwaukee Brewers
On November 23, 2010, Boggs signed a major league contract with the Milwaukee Brewers. Near the conclusion of spring training 2011, the Brewers sent him outright to the Triple-A Nashville Sounds. The Brewers purchased his contract on April 22. On May 26, he was outrighted to the minor leagues. Boggs declared for free agency on October 17.

Pittsburgh Pirates
The Pittsburgh Pirates signed Boggs to a minor league contract on November 22, 2011. In November 2012, Boggs became a free agent.

Minnesota Twins
In 2013, Boggs played for Rochester, the Twins AAA affiliate. He appeared in 21 games before being released.

Atlanta Braves
Boggs signed a minor league deal with the Braves during the 2013 season. Boggs re-signed to a minor league deal with the Atlanta Braves on May 16, 2014.

York Revolution
Boggs signed with the York Revolution of the Atlantic League of Professional Baseball for the 2015 season. He became a free agent after the 2015 season.

References

External links

1983 births
Living people
Texas Rangers players
Milwaukee Brewers players
African-American baseball players
Baseball players from St. Louis
Georgia Tech Yellow Jackets baseball players
Orleans Firebirds players
Major League Baseball outfielders
Spokane Indians players
Clinton LumberKings players
Bakersfield Blaze players
Frisco RoughRiders players
Oklahoma RedHawks players
Oklahoma City RedHawks players
Nashville Sounds players
Indianapolis Indians players
Rochester Red Wings players
Gwinnett Braves players
Bridgeport Bluefish players
Yaquis de Obregón players
American expatriate baseball players in Mexico
Navegantes del Magallanes players
American expatriate baseball players in Venezuela
Águilas de Mexicali players
York Revolution players
21st-century African-American sportspeople
20th-century African-American people